A Night of Terror may refer to:

A Night of Terror (1911 film), directed by Edwin S. Porter
Love from a Stranger (1937 film), released in the United States as A Night of Terror

See also
Night of Terror (disambiguation)